A circus train is a method of conveyance for circus troupes. One of the larger users of circus trains was the Ringling Bros. and Barnum & Bailey Circus (RBBX), a famous American circus formed when the Ringling Brothers Circus purchased the Barnum and Bailey Circus in 1907.

In 1872 the P.T. Barnum Circus had grown so large that it was decided that they would only play at large venues, and that they would travel by train. P.T. Barnum had two of his  partners, William Cameron Coup and Dan Costello, come up with a system to load the circus wagons on to railroad flat cars. Using a system of inclined planes, called runs, and crossover plates between cars, they developed a system of ropes and pulleys, along with a snubber post to get the wagons on and off of the flat cars. They used horses to pull the wagons up the run and then would hitch a second team to pull it down the run cars (flats). The off-loading was much the same as loading, but a snubber post was used to help brake the wagons' descent down the run. That system, first used in 1872, was used by the RBBBC until its closing, although through more modern methods.

When the circus switched to travel by train they began by using flatcars from the Pennsylvania Railroad, which turned out to be hazardous because the Pennsylvania Railroad's cars were in poor shape. In mid-season it was decided that they would buy their own cars, and when the P.T. Barnum Circus left Columbus, Ohio, it traveled on the first circus-owned train. It was made up of 60 cars, including 19–45 flatcars carrying about 100 wagons.

Circus trains have proven well-suited for the transportation of heavy equipment (tents, rolling wagons, vehicles and machinery) and animals (elephants, lions, tigers and horses), despite tragic accidents over the years.

Ringling Bros. and Barnum & Bailey Circuses separately and together grew to dominate live entertainment through their frequent purchases of many other American circuses. In modern times, they traveled in two circus trains, the blue unit and the red unit, following an alternating two-year schedule to bring a new show to each location once a year. There were also special stock cars for the exotic animals and flatcars for the transportation of circus wagons, equipment, and even a bus used for local transportation at performance sites.

The Ringling Bros. and Barnum & Bailey Circus closed its doors permanently in May 2017, and its train cars were either auctioned off or scrapped not too long after. In early 2018, Kirby Family Farm, located in Florida, purchased some of the cars and planned to turn them into dormitories for kids with special needs.

Strates Shows, a traveling carnival, has operated a carnival train since at least the 1930s and bills itself as "America's only railroad carnival".

In Germany, several circuses began using trains to move between locations in the 19th century. Smaller circus operations gradually switched to road transport in the second half of the 20th century, but Circus Krone moved by rail until 1999 and Circus Roncalli continues to do so in 2021. While the movements were and are made in dedicated trains, the necessary flatcars and boxcars were and are supplied by DB Cargo and its predecessor companies, or private car lessors - with the exception of a special rail car to transport big elephants, which was a private car of Circus Krone.

Famous cinematic portrayals of circus trains include 1941's Dumbo by Ben Sharpsteen, 1947's Fun and Fancy Free by Jack Kinney, Bill Roberts and Hamilton Luske, 1952's The Greatest Show on Earth by Cecil B. DeMille, the 1983 James Bond movie Octopussy, 1989's Indiana Jones and the Last Crusade by Steven Spielberg and George Lucas and 2011's Water for Elephants based on Sara Gruen's 2006 novel of the same name, by Francis Lawrence. A circus train is also a major location in Madagascar 3: Europe's Most Wanted.

See also
 Hammond Circus Train Wreck
 Mighty Haag Railroad Shows toured the US and Canada by rail from 1909 to 1915. 
 James Anthony Bailey
 Phineas Taylor Barnum
 Showmen's Rest
 The Greatest Show on Earth

References

External links
 Ringling Bros. and Barnum & Bailey Circus
 The James E. Strates Train
 Circus World Museum

Circuses
Trains